Saturn FC is an American soccer team based in Marietta, Georgia, United States. Founded in 2009, the team plays in National Premier Soccer League (NPSL), a national amateur league at the fourth tier of the American Soccer Pyramid, in the Southeast Division.

The team plays its home games at the Georgia Soccer Park in nearby East Point, Georgia, where they have played since 2009. The team's colors are red, black and gold.

History

Players

Current roster
as at June 7, 2009

Year-by-year

Head coaches
  David Wolf (2009–present)

Stadia
 Georgia Soccer Park; East Point, Georgia (2009–present)

External links
 Official Site
 Georgia Soccer Park

National Premier Soccer League teams
Soccer clubs in Georgia (U.S. state)
Marietta, Georgia
2009 establishments in Georgia (U.S. state)
Sports in Cobb County, Georgia